The Keti Bandar Port is a port on the Arabian Sea, in the Thatta District, Sindh, Pakistan. The port was built on the remains of the older seaport of Debal where Muhammad bin Qasim and his army arrived from Iraq. Keti Bandar is approximately 150 highway kilometers from Karachi, with a driving time of around 3.5 to 4 hours. Two of the larger towns on the route from Karachi to Keti Bandar are Gharo and Mirpur Sakro.

Economy
Keti Bandar Project was planned to build a port and power station at Keti Bandar. The Keti Bandar economy completely relies upon fishing and the entire village is dependent on the fishermen who sometimes spend days at a time on their boats in the Arabian Sea. As these fishermen return with their catch they display their products in the open market, where buyers collect the fish and transport it to Karachi.

See also 
 List of ports in Pakistan
 Keti
 Karachi Port
 Port Qasim
 Gwadar Port
 List of seaports

External links 
 Keti Bandar project may be revived - DAWN.com

References

Thatta District
Ports and harbours of Pakistan
Tourist attractions in Thatta